National Secondary Route 224, or just Route 224 (or ) is a National Road Route of Costa Rica, located in the Cartago province.

Description
In Cartago province the route covers Paraíso canton (Paraíso, Santiago, Orosi, Cachí, Birrisito districts).

History
On 25 August 2020, the bridge across the dam of Lake Cachí, showed signs of structural instability, with a crack and swing motion when joining the road on the west end, after which it was closed.

References

Highways in Costa Rica